Still from the Heart is Angelic Upstarts's fourth album, released in 1982.

Track listing
All tracks composed by Thomas Mensforth and Ray Cowie; except where noted
Side A
 "Never Say Die"
 "Flames of Brixton"
 "Action Man"
 "Wasted (Love By None)"
 "Here Comes Trouble" (Mensforth, Cowie, Tony "Feedback" Morrison)

Side B
 "Theme for Lost Souls" (Mensforth, Cowie, Steve Levine)
 "I Stand Accused" (Mensforth, Cowie, Morrison, Derek Wade)
 "Black Knights of the 80's" (Mensforth, Cowie, Wade)
 "Cry Wolf" (Mensforth, Cowie, Wade)
 "Soldier" (Harvey Andrews)

Personnel
Angelic Upstarts
Mensi - vocals
Mond - guitar, vocals
Tony "Feedback" Morrison - bass, vocals
Derek "Decca" Wade - drums, percussion, backing vocals
with:
Steve Levine - keyboards, backing vocals
Phil Pickett - organ and backing vocals on "Here Comes Trouble"
Steve Grainger - tenor and alto saxophone
Tony Hughes - trumpet, trombone
Technical
Bill Smith - sleeve
Gered Mankowitz - photography

References

1982 albums
Angelic Upstarts albums
Albums produced by Steve Levine
EMI Records albums